Hoopa Airport  is a public airport located on Airport Road next to the Trinity River, one mile (1.6 km) southeast of Hoopa, serving Humboldt County, California, United States. It is mostly used for general aviation.

Facilities 
Hoopa Airport covers 40 acres and has one runway:

 Runway 14/32: 2,325 x 50 ft (709 x 15 m), surface: asphalt

References

External links 

Airports in Humboldt County, California